Kevin Reeves (born October 2, 1958) is a Canadian former professional ice hockey player. He won the Michel Brière Memorial Trophy as the Most Valuable Player in the Quebec Major Junior Hockey League for his outstanding play with the Montreal Juniors during the 1977–78 QMJHL season.

Career statistics

References

External links

Canadian ice hockey centres
Montreal Canadiens draft picks
Montreal Juniors players
Muskegon Mohawks players
Nova Scotia Voyageurs players
1958 births
Living people